Piercer can mean:

 A technician who performs the act of body piercing
 Piercer (Dungeons & Dragons), a fictional creature in the Dungeons & Dragons fantasy roleplaying game with Luis Zenon